Anastasiya Shkurdai (born 3 January 2003) is a Belarusian swimmer. She represented Belarus at the 2019 World Aquatics Championships in Gwangju, South Korea and she competed in the 4 × 100 metre mixed medley relay event.

She competed at the 2017 European Short Course Swimming Championships in Copenhagen, Denmark and the 2019 European Short Course Swimming Championships in Glasgow, Scotland.

In 2018, she won the silver medal in the girls' 50 metre butterfly event and the bronze medal in the girls' 100 metre butterfly event at the Summer Youth Olympics held in Buenos Aires, Argentina. In the same year, she also competed in several events at the 2018 FINA World Swimming Championships (25 m) held in Hangzhou, China.

In 2021, she represented Belarus at the 2020 Summer Olympics held in Tokyo, Japan. She finished in 8th place in the final of the women's 100 metre butterfly event. She also competed in the women's 100 metre freestyle event and she did not start in the women's 100 metre backstroke event. She competed in two relays events: the women's 4 × 100 metre medley relay and mixed 4 × 100 metre medley relay.

References

External links 
 

Living people
2003 births
Belarusian female freestyle swimmers
Belarusian female butterfly swimmers
Swimmers at the 2018 Summer Youth Olympics
Swimmers at the 2020 Summer Olympics
Olympic swimmers of Belarus
Sportspeople from Brest, Belarus
21st-century Belarusian women